Kaidan is a Japanese ghost story or horror story.

Kaidan or Kwaidan may also refer to:
Kwaidan (film), a 1964 Japanese film by Masaki Kobayashi
Kaidan (2007 film), a Japanese film by Hideo Nakata
Kwaidan: Stories and Studies of Strange Things
Kaidan Restaurant, a Japanese children's storybook series
Kaidan-in, a Rinzai temple in Dazaifu, Fukuoka Prefecture, Japan
Kaidan, Lithuania, a city in Lithuania

See also
BiS Kaidan, a Japanese noise band
Gakkō no Kaidan (disambiguation)
Kaidan Alenko, a character in the Mass Effect series
Kaidanji: Oshikawa Shunrō, a 1987 Japanese book by Jun'ya Yokota and Shingo Aizu